is a retired Japanese football player who last featured for ReinMeer Aomori.

Career statistics
Updated to 1 January 2020.

References

External links
Profile at Sagan Tosu

1989 births
Living people
Association football people from Ibaraki Prefecture
Japanese footballers
J1 League players
J2 League players
Japan Football League players
Montedio Yamagata players
Kashiwa Reysol players
Sagan Tosu players
ReinMeer Aomori players
Association football midfielders